The second season of Degrassi Junior High, a Canadian teen drama television series, aired in Canada from January 4, 1988 to April 18, 1988, consisting of thirteen episodes. The series follows the lives of a group of seventh and eighth grade school children attending the titular school as they face various issues and challenges such as child abuse, homophobia, teenage pregnancy, and body image.

The second season aired on Mondays at 8:30.p.m on CBC Television, in prime time. Re-runs of the first season were slotted an hour earlier by CBC's programming chief Ivan Fecan, who hailed the series, before being moved to 8:30.p.m in the leadup to the second season's debut. In the United States, the first two seasons of the series were aired together as one twenty-six episode season on PBS. The season was released to DVD by WGBH Boston Home Video on June 7, 2005 in the United States, and by Force Entertainment on October 1, 2005 in Australia.

Production 
Following the show's move to prime time, Degrassi Junior High had amassed over a million weekly viewers. Kit Hood and Linda Schuyler decided to continue many of the plotlines from the previous season, while balancing them with more lighthearted plots. Several changes were made for the second season. In one instance, actor Neil Hope, who played Derek "Wheels" Wheeler, began wearing glasses after suffering severe headaches on set, in which his character followed suit. Actress Sarah Charlesworth, who played Suzie Rivera, aimed to leave to concentrate on school.

The premiere episode "Eggbert", centering around pregnant student Christine "Spike" Nelson (Amanda Stepto) and her boyfriend Shane McKay (Bill Parrott) taking care of an egg as if it were a baby, was inspired by an experiment conducted in schools across Toronto to teach children about responsibility.

Episodes

Home media 
The season was released to DVD by WGBH Boston Home Video on June 7, 2005 in the United States, and by Force Entertainment on October 1, 2005 in Australia.

References

Sources 

 

1988 Canadian television seasons
Degrassi Junior High episodes